Frisco City is a town in Monroe County, Alabama, United States. At the 2020 census, the population was 1,170.

Geography
Frisco City is located at  (31.433769, -87.402120).

History
What would become Frisco City started out as two mid-19th century communities named Lufkin and Snider. It initially incorporated as the town of Jones Mill in 1909. It was named for the owner of the local grist mill. Four years later on November 4, 1913, the town was renamed as Roy for Roy Megargel, owner of the Gulf, Florida, and Alabama Railroad (GFA). The renaming was done on the condition that "Roy" would receive a rail line to the Town.

When Megargel failed to deliver on his promise, the town reverted to its name of Jones Mill in 1919 (also referred to as Jones Mills plural). Megargel failed to keep his name on Jones Mill, but later received a community named for him, that of Megargel, a census-designated place .

In 1925, the St. Louis and San Francisco Railroad bought the GFA Railroad and agreed to complete what Megargel was not able to. In 1928, the line was completed, and in gratitude, the town formally renamed itself as Frisco City (taken from San Francisco).

Climate
Climate is characterized by relatively high temperatures and evenly distributed precipitation throughout the year.  The Köppen Climate Classification sub-type for this climate is "Cfa" (Humid Subtropical Climate).

Demographics

At the 2000 census there were 1,460 people, 589 households, and 405 families in the town. The racial makeup of the town was 52.95% White, 43.56% Black or African American, 1.51% Native American, 0.41% Asian, 0.48% from other races, and 1.10% from two or more races. 1.16% of the population were Hispanic or Latino of any race.
Of the 589 households 35.1% had children under the age of 18 living with them, 45.0% were married couples living together, 19.5% had a female householder with no husband present, and 31.1% were non-families. 30.1% of households were one person and 14.9% were one person aged 65 or older. The average household size was 2.48 and the average family size was 3.07.

The age distribution was 29.3% under the age of 18, 8.5% from 18 to 24, 27.1% from 25 to 44, 21.9% from 45 to 64, and 13.2% 65 or older. The median age was 35 years. For every 100 females, there were 84.3 males. For every 100 females age 18 and over, there were 80.1 males.

The median household income was $26,176 and the median family income  was $32,663. Males had a median income of $26,898 versus $19,464 for females. The per capita income for the town was $12,170. About 19.5% of families and 25.5% of the population were below the poverty line, including 32.8% of those under age 18 and 29.7% of those age 65 or over.

2010 census
At the 2010 census there were 1,309 people, 531 households, and 352 families in the town. The racial makeup of the town was 49.3% Black or African American, 45.4% White, 1.3% Native American, 0.0% Asian, 0.8% from other races, and 2.8% from two or more races. 1.8% of the population were Hispanic or Latino of any race.
Of the 531 households 27.5% had children under the age of 18 living with them, 39.0% were married couples living together, 22.6% had a female householder with no husband present, and 33.7% were non-families. 29.2% of households were one person and 9.3% were one person aged 65 or older. The average household size was 2.47 and the average family size was 3.07.

The age distribution was 25.4% under the age of 18, 7.6% from 18 to 24, 22.5% from 25 to 44, 28.5% from 45 to 64, and 16.0% 65 or older. The median age was 40.7 years. For every 100 females, there were 85.4 males. For every 100 females age 18 and over, there were 85.5 males.

The median household income was $23,884 and the median family income  was $28,512. Males had a median income of $32,917 versus $19,327 for females. The per capita income for the town was $12,181. About 34.6% of families and 38.3% of the population were below the poverty line, including 60.7% of those under age 18 and 19.2% of those age 65 or over.

Notable person
 Alfred Malone, professional football player

References

External links
Coastal Gateway Regional Economic Development Alliance

Towns in Monroe County, Alabama
Towns in Alabama